Robert Edward McCracken (born February 25, 1982) is an American singer who is the lead vocalist and songwriter of the rock band The Used.

Early life 
McCracken was born in Provo, Utah, and grew up in Orem. He was raised in a Mormon family with three sisters (Katie, Melanie, Rachel) and one younger brother (Joseph Taylor). McCracken has stated that he read quite voraciously growing up, due to the influence of his mother, who was a schoolteacher. At age 12, he started playing the trumpet in a local band called "I'm With Stupid". He attended Timpanogos High School for a brief time, before dropping out at 16.

Eldest son of the household, Bert enjoyed a happy home life as a child, but as he grew into a teenager his and his parents' views conflicted. He rebeled against his parents and against their Mormon religion, eventually leaving the Latter Day Saint Church. He dropped out of high school; soon after, he left his home at the age of 16. For some time he was homeless until he found enough money for an apartment, moving in with then-girlfriend Kate.

Career 

In January 2001, when the band called Dumb Luck (which later became The Used, then consisting of Quinn, Jeph and Branden) were looking for a singer, Quinn remembered Bert and he was invited to try out. After being given music that the band had written without words, Bert wrote the lyrics to what would become "Maybe Memories" and returned the next day with a newly recorded version of the song. The band welcomed him immediately, and renamed themselves "Used". They were eventually discovered by John Feldmann and signed to Reprise Records; they became "The Used" when it was discovered that a Boston band had already trademarked the name "Used". On June 25, 2002, they released their self-titled debut album.

Personal life 
McCracken appeared on the MTV show The Osbournes while he was dating Kelly Osbourne, to her mother's dismay and disapproval.

In 2004, McCracken's then-pregnant ex-girlfriend Kate died of a drug overdose, as the recording of The Used's second album In Love and Death was coming to a close.

In July 2008, McCracken married his Australian fiancée, Alison, at a private ceremony in Los Angeles. In July 2013, he announced that he and his wife had relocated from Los Angeles to Sydney, Australia, where their first daughter, Cleopatra Rose, was born in January, 2014. Their second child, Minerva Bloom, was born on March 23, 2018.

McCracken has struggled with drug addiction and alcoholism in the past, the former referenced in the song "Bulimic" on The Used's self-titled album. However, he has since overcome his addictions, being sober since 2012.

Bert McCracken has voiced his support for Palestine and left-wing politics alongside being critical of aspects of contemporary American culture and society, such as the influence of larger corporations on the music industry; which partly prompted his move to Australia in 2013. His political views were also influential in the lyrical content of The Used's 2014 album Imaginary Enemy.

About a year prior to the recording of The Used's 2017 album The Canyon, McCracken's friend Tregen died via suicide which heavily influenced the album's lyrical content.

Discography

Singles

Other appearances

Filmography

Film

Television

References

External links 

 
 The Used official website

1982 births
Living people
Alternative rock pianists
Alternative rock singers
American alternative rock musicians
Former Latter Day Saints
American male singer-songwriters
American rock keyboardists
American rock pianists
American male pianists
VJs (media personalities)
American rock singers
American rock songwriters
Musicians from Provo, Utah
The Used members
20th-century American singers
21st-century American singers
21st-century American pianists
20th-century American male singers
American expatriates in Australia
21st-century American male singers
Singer-songwriters from Utah